Naresh Puglia (born 20 May 1948) was a member of the 12th Lok Sabha and 13th Lok Sabha, the lower house of Parliament, from the Chandrapur constituency. He was elected as a member of the Indian National Congress.

On 30 November 1972, Naresh married Sheeladevi. He was a member of Rajya Sabha from Maharashtra State from 5 July 1986 to 4 July 1992.

See also
Chandrapur

1948 births
Living people
Indian National Congress politicians
People from Maharashtra
India MPs 1998–1999
India MPs 1999–2004
Member of legislative Assembly from Maharashtra from Chandrapur constituency in 1978 & 1980-1985
People from Wardha district
People from Chandrapur district
Lok Sabha members from Maharashtra
Rajya Sabha members from Maharashtra
Marathi politicians
Indian National Congress politicians from Maharashtra